"Somewhere in Neverland" is a song by American rock band All Time Low for their fifth studio album Don't Panic (2012). Written and produced by the band's lead vocalist/guitarist Alex Gaskarth and Mike Green, the song was released through Hopeless Records as the second official single off the album on September 18, 2012. The song uses allusions to Peter Pan and the story Peter and Wendy as a metaphor for the narrator refusing to grow up.

Reception
Tim Sendra of AllMusic labelled "Somewhere in Neverland" as a surefire radio hit and one of three "album picks" for its "sweetly desperate romanticism." The iTunes review for Don't Panic cited "Somewhere in Neverland" as an "unarguably catchy" album highlight, describing it as a "salient single that chugs on power pop chords [...] before triggering a chorus peppered with more barbed hooks than a tackle box." Joseph Atilano of Inquirer.net praised Gaskarth's songwriting abilities on the song as well as the catchiness of the chorus, summarizing the song as "addictive".

Music video
The music video for "Somewhere in Neverland" premiered on March 19, 2013. Directed by Raul Gonzo, the video features the band escaping their boring work life through some "creative use" of a photocopier, with such scenes as a hot air balloon ride and a moon landing depicted on Xeroxed papers. MTV correspondent James Montgomery praised the video for being enjoyable in spite of its evidently limited budget: "Working with limited funds, they've managed to create a clip that's both funny and strangely sweet."

Chart performance

References

2012 singles
2012 songs
All Time Low songs
Emo pop songs
Hopeless Records singles
Songs written by Jack Barakat
Songs written by Rian Dawson
Songs written by Alex Gaskarth
Songs written by Zack Merrick